Walter Widemann (born 20 November 1893, date of death unknown) was a Swiss sabre fencer. He competed at the 1936 and 1948 Summer Olympics.

References

External links
 

1893 births
Year of death missing
Swiss male sabre fencers
Olympic fencers of Switzerland
Fencers at the 1936 Summer Olympics
Fencers at the 1948 Summer Olympics